Hajjiabad (also Romanized as Ḩājjīābād) is a village in Vardasht Rural District, in the Central District of Semirom County, Isfahan Province, Iran. At the 2006 census, its population was 144, in 39 families.

References 

Populated places in Semirom County